The New Haven Senators were a professional ice hockey team that played in the American Hockey League during the 1992–93 AHL season. The team played their home games at the New Haven Coliseum. The Senators were known as the New Haven Nighthawks. from 1972 to 1992. The team changed their name to match their new parent club, the Ottawa Senators.

The market was subsequently home to:
Beast of New Haven (1997–1999)
New Haven Knights (UHL) (2000–2002).
Bridgeport Sound Tigers (2001–present)

Individual records
Goals: 23 - Greg Pankewicz
Assists: 44 - Scott White
Points: 60 - Martin St. Amour
Penalty minutes: 195 - Gerry St. Cyr
GAA: 3.32 - Darrin Madeley
SV%: .905 - Darrin Madeley
Goaltending wins: 10 - Darrin Madeley and Mark Laforest
Shutouts: 1 - Mark Laforest
Games: 80 - Scott White

Results

See also
Professional Hockey In Connecticut

External links
 1992–93 roster

Defunct American Hockey League teams
Senators
Ice hockey teams in Connecticut
Ice hockey clubs established in 1992
Sports clubs disestablished in 1993
Ottawa Senators minor league affiliates
1992 establishments in Connecticut
1993 disestablishments in Connecticut